Events from the year 1635 in France.

Incumbents 
Monarch: Louis XIII

Events
 
 
 
 
 
 

 February 22 – The Académie française in Paris is formally constituted as the national academy for the preservation of the French language.
 May – France declares war on Spain.
 May 30 – Thirty Years' War – The Peace of Prague is signed, which ends the German civil war aspect of the conflict.
 Guadeloupe and Martinique are colonized by France.
 Dominica is claimed by France.

Births
 

 
 June 3 – Philippe Quinault, French writer (d. 1688)
 July 19 – Francine Descartes (d. 1640)
 July 23 – Adam Dollard des Ormeaux (d. 1660)
 October 7 – Roger de Piles, French painter (d. 1709)
 November 27 – Françoise d'Aubigné, marquise de Maintenon, second wife of Louis XIV of France (d. 1719)

Deaths
 

 
 December 25 – Samuel de Champlain, French explorer and founder of Quebec (b. c.1567)

See also

References

1630s in France